The Lord's Vineyard (French: Les Vignes du Seigneur) is a 1958 French comedy film directed by Jean Boyer and starring Fernandel, Pierre Dux and Simone Valère. The title is a traditional expression for drunkenness in French. It is based on a play by Francis de Croisset and Robert de Flers, which had previously been adapted into a 1932 film.

It was shot at the Billancourt Studios in Paris. The sets were designed by the art director Robert Giordani.

Cast
 Fernandel as Henri Lévrier
 Pierre Dux as Comte Hubert Martin de Kardec
 Simone Valère as Gisèle Bourjeon
 Évelyne Dandry as Yvonne Bourjeon
 Charles Bouillaud as Jean - le domestique des Bourjeon
 Mag-Avril as La générale
 Lona Rita as Lulu
 Jeanne Fusier-Gir as Tante Aline Tremplin
 Michel Garland as Jack
 Béatrice Bretty as Mme. Bourjeon

References

Bibliography 
 Goble, Alan. The Complete Index to Literary Sources in Film. Walter de Gruyter, 1999.

External links 
 

1958 films
French comedy films
1958 comedy films
1950s French-language films
Films directed by Jean Boyer
Films shot at Billancourt Studios
French films based on plays
1950s French films